"At Mail Call Today" is a song written by American country music artist Gene Autry and Fred Rose. The two had a successful song writing partnership dating back to 1941, including "Be Honest With Me", "Tweedle-O-Twill" and "Tears On My Pillow". Rose, with Roy Acuff, founded Acuff-Rose Music Publishing in 1942, and in 1947, would go on to producing Hank Williams. Autry, after a brief lull in film making due to WWII, would be back to his pre-war output by 1946.

Background
The song is similar to other contemporary love songs and deals with the possibility of unfaithfulness. The lyrics describe a young soldier opening a Dear John letter at mail call and learning that the girl he loved from back home has left him. The final words reflect the soldier's despair:

Good luck and God bless you

Wherever you stray

The world for me ended

At Mail Call To-day.

Chart performance
The song, recorded in December 1944, was Gene Autry's most successful song on the Juke Box Folk charts, peaking at number one for eight weeks with a total of twenty-two weeks on the charts. The B-side of "At Mail Call Today", a song entitled, "I'll Be Back" peaked at number seven on the same chart.

Charts

References

Further reading
Cusic, Don. Gene Autry: His Life and Career. Jefferson, NC: McFarland & Co., 2007.    
Jones, John Bush. The Songs That Fought the War: Popular Music and the Home Front, 1939–1945. Waltham. Mass.: Brandeis University Press, 2006.  
Kingsbury, Paul and Alanna Nash. Will the Circle Be Unbroken: Country Music in America. London: DK, 2006.    
Wolfe, Charles K. and James Edward Akenson. Country Music Goes to War. Lexington, KY: University Press of Kentucky, 2005.  

Gene Autry songs
Songs of World War II
1944 songs
1945 singles
Songs written by Gene Autry
Okeh Records singles
Military mail